Châtenay-Malabry is a commune in the southwestern suburbs of Paris. It is located 10.8 km (6.7 mi) from the center of Paris.

The French writer Chateaubriand lived in the estate Vallée-aux-Loups at Châtenay-Malabry. The Garden City in the Butte Rouge, the Cité Jardins, is one of the earliest examples of housing at moderated rents (HLM).

Châtenay is the location of École Centrale Paris, of the Faculty of Pharmacy of the University of Paris-Sud and of French national laboratory of doping detection. It is also the home of the Arboretum de la Vallée-aux-Loups. The high-speed LGV Atlantique crosses the city through a tunnel covered by a park called Coulée verte (greenway).

From 31 December 2002, it was part of the Agglomeration community of Hauts de Bièvre, which merged into the Métropole du Grand Paris in January 2016.

Geography

Châtenay-Malabry is situated near the Parc de Sceaux.

It borders the department of Essonne which borders the department of Yvelines. Châtenay-Malabry is demarcated by the communes of Sceaux, Antony, Bièvres, Plessis-Robinson and Verrières-le-Buisson.

As for the North and South entrances, they are, to say the least, a part of the urban fabric of the town.

The two main entrances to the town are located west and east of the Division Leclerc avenue, which is the main road of the town. In the direction of Verrières Forest is a large roundabout which appears as a clearing in the forest before diving into the urban landscape. In the direction of Antony is a simple roundabout located at the southeast corner of the Sceaux Park.

History
Originally simply called Châtenay, the name of the commune officially became Châtenay-Malabry in 1920.

The name Châtenay comes from castellanum = petit château (little castle) and  Malabry comes from a deformation of badly located, spoiled ground.

Transportation
Châtenay-Malabry is served by Robinson station on Paris RER line B. This station is located at the border between the commune of Châtenay-Malabry and the commune of Sceaux, on the Sceaux side of the border.

Education
Schools include:
 Seven public preschools (maternelles): Jean-Jaurès, Jules-Verne, des Mouilleboeufs, Pierre-Brossolette, Pierre-Mendès-France, Thomas-Masaryk, and Suzanne-Buisson
 Seven public elementary schools: Jean-Jaurès, Jules-Verne, des Mouilleboeufs, Pierre-Brossolette, Pierre-Mendès-France, Thomas-Masaryk, and Léonard-de-Vinci.
 Public junior high schools (collèges): Léonard-de-Vinci, Pierre-Brossolette, Thomas-Masaryk
 Public senior high schools:  and Lycée polyvalent Jean-Jaurès
 Private school: Groupe scolaire Sophie-Barat (elementary through senior high)

Notable people
Voltaire spent time at Chatenay in 1719, and was probably born out of wedlock there in 1694
François-René de Chateaubriand (1768–1848) writer, politician and diplomat
Marie Recio (1814–1862), French mezzo-soprano, second wife of composer Hector Berlioz
Sully Prudhomme (1839–1907), French poet and essayist, winner of the first Nobel Prize in Literature, 1901
Jean Fautrier (1898–1964), painter and sculptor
Emmanuel Mounier (1905–1950), Christian philosopher
Paul Ricoeur (1913–2005), Christian philosopher
Jérôme Rothen (born 1978), French international football player
Clémence Poésy (born 1982), actress and model
Hugo Duminil-Copin (born 1985), mathematician
Hatem Ben Arfa (born 1987), French international football player, was raised here
Mahamadou Baradji, basketball player
Khassa Camara, footballer
Laurent Bernard, basketball player
Grégoire Colin (born 1975), French movie actor
Cyrille Eliezer-Vanerot, basketball player
Kévin Malcuit (born 1991), footballer
Côme (born 1994), musician
Allan Saint-Maximin (born 1997), French football player

Points of interest

 Arboretum de la Vallée-aux-Loups

Twin towns
Châtenay-Malabry is twinned with
  Bergneustadt (Oberbergischer Kreis, Germany) since 1967, which is also twinned with Landsmeer
  Landsmeer (North Holland, Netherlands) since 1986, which is also twinned with Bergneustadt
  Wellington (Shropshire, United Kingdom) since 2001
  Bracciano (Bracciano, Italy) since 2011

See also

Communes of the Hauts-de-Seine department

References

External links

 Châtenay-Malabry official website

Communes of Hauts-de-Seine
Hauts-de-Seine communes articles needing translation from French Wikipedia